Joyce Anne Anelay, Baroness Anelay of St Johns,  (born 17 July 1947), is a British Conservative Party politician, previously serving as Minister of State of the Foreign and Commonwealth Office from August 2014 to June 2017. Anelay was appointed as Minister of State at the Department for Exiting the European Union in the Second May ministry, after the 2017 reshuffle.

Anelay was Government Chief Whip in the House of Lords from 12 May 2010 until 6 August 2014, having previously been Opposition Chief Whip prior to the 2010 General Election.

Early life
Born in Hackney on 17 July 1947, daughter of Stanley Clarke, she was christened Joyce Anne and was educated locally at Enfield County School. She attended Bristol University, graduating with the degree of BA and after further studies at Brunel, took the postgraduate degree of MA.

Following university, Anelay worked as a secondary school teacher from 1969 to 1974. She later became a volunteer adviser with the Citizens' Advice Bureau, served as a Justice of the Peace for Surrey and sat on the Social Security Appeal Tribunal.

Political career
Prior to her elevation to the peerage, Anelay held a number of senior posts in the Conservative Party organisation. She was Chair of the Conservative Women's National Committee from 1993 to 1996, appointed Officer of the Most Excellent Order of the British Empire (OBE) in 1990, and in 1995 was promoted Dame Commander (DBE). She was created a Life Peer as Baroness Anelay of St Johns, of St John's in the County of Surrey in 1996.

Between May 1997 and June 2002, Baroness Anelay served in various Conservative front bench posts, including Opposition Whip and Shadow Minister for Culture, Media and Sport. She was a Shadow Home Office Minister from June 2002 to July 2007, and from 2 July 2007, she served as Opposition Chief Whip in the House of Lords until 2010. In 2009, Anelay was sworn of the Privy Council.

After the General Election, on 12 May 2010, Anelay was appointed Government Chief Whip in the Lords and Captain of the Honourable Corps of Gentlemen at Arms.

On 6 August 2014, the day after Baroness Warsi's resignation, Anelay was appointed in Warsi's place as Minister of State for South Asia and the Commonwealth, attending Cabinet (although not as a member). Anelay did not on take on Warsi's faith and communities brief, which reverted to Eric Pickles.

In April 2017, Anelay expressed concerns about reports of homophobia in Chechnya, and she released the following statement: "The detention and ill-treatment of over 100 gay men in Chechnya is extremely concerning. Reports have also suggested that at least three of these men have been killed."

In May 2020, as Chairwoman of the International Relations and Defence Committee in Britain's House of Lords, she questioned whether Israel should continue to receive preferential access to the U.K. market if the plan for annexing West Bank territory, as laid out in the incoming unity government's coalition agreement, proceeds.

Personal life
Anelay married in 1970, her university contemporary, Richard Anelay, QC, a Deputy High Court Judge, leading family and criminal law barrister, and former head of 1 King's Bench Walk Chambers.

Arms

References

External links
Joyce Anelay on the Conservative Party website
www.burkespeerage.com – ANELAY OF ST JOHNS, LP
www.parliament.the-stationery-office.co.uk

 www.ukwhoswho.com

|-

|-

|-

|-

|-

1947 births
Alumni of Brunel University London
Alumni of the University of Bristol
Conservative Party (UK) Baronesses- and Lords-in-Waiting
Conservative Party (UK) life peers
Dames Commander of the Order of the British Empire
Life peeresses created by Elizabeth II
Government ministers of the United Kingdom
Honourable Corps of Gentlemen at Arms
Living people
Members of the Privy Council of the United Kingdom
People from Hackney, London
People from Surrey
Women government ministers in the United Kingdom